Feminism: The Essential Historical Writings is an anthology edited with an introduction and commentaries by Miriam Schneir. It was originally published in 1972 and re-published in 1994 by Vintage Books. The book is in print and can be ordered online through Amazon or Indigo. It comprises essays, fiction, memoirs, and letters by what Schneir labels the major feminist writers. The content included ranges from 1776 to 1929 and focuses on topics of civil rights and emancipation. The book has had an influence on education, being used as a resource in women's studies classes. Various scholars have given both positive and negative reviews of this book.

Miriam Schneir

Personal life 

Miriam Schneir was born in 1933 and grew up in New York City. She comes from a middle-class family that was not politically engaged or involved in scholarship. Her background is Jewish, as her grandparents were orthodox Jews and her parents were non-practicing Jews. Her husband was Walter Schneir, who was born in 1927 and died in 2009. Together they had two sons and one daughter.

Education 
Schneir graduated from Queens College in 1955, being the first person in her family to graduate from college. Before graduating from Queens College, Schneir also attended Antioch College for two years. When she was at Antioch College, she wanted to become a writer. However, she finished her education at Queens College in order to get her teaching license. The switch from being a writing major to education was prompted by the higher financial security of being a teacher.

Career 
Schneir initially worked as an early childhood educator after graduating from college. In the 1960s, she became a full-time writer. She also held a position as a research associate with the Columbia University Center for Social Sciences Program in Sex Roles and Social Change.

Views and politics 
During her time at Antioch College, Schneir began to identify with leftist politics and ideas. Her thinking has been influenced by her time at Antioch College and the communist colleagues she encountered in her career as an educator. She opposes systems of inequality and has strived to take action against them. She has also been active in rallies, petitions, and campaigning. She was involved with the Adlai Stevenson and Henry A. Wallace campaigns.

Work on Feminism: The Essential Historical Writings 
In the late 1960s, Schneir was exposed to the concept of feminism for the first time. Shortly after, because of her interest in the topic, she began to collect works and search for publishers for an anthology, which would later become Feminism: The Essential Historical Writings. Her feminist thought was influenced by Eleanor Flexner, Gerda Lerner, Aileen S. Kraditor, Simone de Beauvoir, Betty Friedan, and the works she was reading for the anthology. She worked on the book vigorously, and it was published in January of 1972.

Other works 
 Co-author of Invitation to Inquest (1965)
Editor of Feminism in Our Time: The Essential Writings, World War II to the Present (1994)
 Editor of The Vintage Book of Historical Feminism (1996)
 Writer of preface and afterword for Final Verdict: What Really Happened in the Rosenberg Case (2010)

Her work has also appeared in various publications such as Ms., The Nation, The New York Times Magazine, and many others.

Introduction and commentaries 
Schneir wrote the introduction and commentaries for this book. In the book's introduction, she discusses the purpose of the book as uncovering feminist writings of the past, how the content included focuses on "unsolved feminist problems," and the past and future of the feminist movement. For each work included in the book, she wrote a brief introduction to the work and its author.

Content 
The book is made up of essays, fiction, memoirs, and letters by what Schneir labels the major feminist writers, including Elizabeth Cady Stanton, George Sand, Mary Wollstonecraft, Abigail Adams, Emma Goldman, Friedrich Engels, Sojourner Truth, Susan B. Anthony, John Stuart Mill, Margaret Sanger, Virginia Woolf, and many others. The materials in this book range from the 18th to 20th century, with the earliest work being from 1776 and the latest being from 1929. Schneir describes this as the phase of "old feminism". Most of the works included were written by Americans, with the addition of some by European writers. The book has five sections: Eighteenth Century Rebels, Women Alone, An American Women’s Movement, Men as Feminists, and Twentieth-Century Themes. The content is related to a theme of civil rights and emancipation, specifically focusing on topics of marriage, economic dependence, and personal independence and selfhood. It also includes multiple works written by male socialists, linking ideas of feminism and socialism together.

Choice of content 
Schneir described her process of choosing the material for the book as looking for the basic, essential writings of feminism that everyone should know. She justifies the use of predominantly American content through her American nationality and the idea that the United States was the world center of "old feminism". The influence of Schneir’s leftist background can also be considered when examining the content chosen for this book.

List of content included 
Schneir includes experts from the works below. The works are listed in chronological order.

Influence

Educational use 
This book has held influence in education as it has been used to teach students about feminism. In the absence of the history of feminism from traditional history books, students studied this book in women's studies classes. Some scholars say that it is an accessible and useful resource for undergraduate courses focusing on the history of feminism. It is said to be good because it covers old materials in an engaging way and encourages students to continue learning about them. Others recognize that it provides insight into how particular discourses and narratives are established and think of it as a resource for students to be critical of and challenge the dominant constructions of feminist history.

Reviews 
One common point of discussion throughout reviews is the construction of the history of feminism that this book produces. Knowledge production is often critiqued, as sometimes it is based on very few ideas. This book produces a knowledge of feminism without considering multiple ideas. Some argue that this book highlights a linear progression of a western narrative of feminism, not examining feminism in different historical periods or different countries. This results in the absence of diverse views and perspectives. Further, some note that the book fails to consider race. The construction of feminist history produced in it both misrepresents and does not appropriately include Black women's perspectives. 

Multiple scholars mentioned Schneir's introduction and commentaries in their reviews. The writing on the back cover of the book is critiqued for being misleading as Schneir states that the book highlights ignored or forgotten materials, but most of the material is actually pretty well known. Some also feel that more critical introductions to the works and more critical bibliographies for each writer would have added value to the book.

Some scholars recognize the importance of the book. They feel that it is an excellent collection of works from the history of feminism. Others additionally note that the book holds historical significance.

References 

1972 anthologies
1972 non-fiction books
American anthologies
Feminist books
Feminism and history
Vintage Books books